Sagamihara Campus is a facility of the Japan Aerospace Exploration Agency (JAXA) in Sagamihara, Kanagawa Prefecture.

Gallery

References

External links 

 Sagamihara Campus JAXA
 Sagamihara Campus ISAS

Space program of Japan
Space technology research institutes